William Fogerty, FRIAI, FRIBA, AAI was an Irish architect active in mid-nineteenth-century Limerick, London, New York City and Dublin.

Born in Limerick, he studied in the early 1850s at Queen's College, Cork. He moved to Dublin in the early 1860s, to London and then New York in the early 1870s, and back to Dublin in 1875. His offices were at 23 Harcourt Street, Dublin. He died of  smallpox at the age of forty-four in 1878. Architects in his family included his father, John Fogerty of Limerick, his brother Joseph Fogerty of London, and his son, John Frederick Fogerty of Dublin.

References

1833 births
1878 deaths
Architects from Limerick (city)
Irish emigrants to the United States (before 1923)
Alumni of Queens College Cork
Fellows of the Royal Institute of British Architects
Deaths from smallpox
19th-century Irish architects